The New Eat Bulaga! Indonesia is a variety and game show In Indonesia produced by Television and Production Exponents (TAPE) Inc., and aired by antv Network. It is based on the Philippines' longest-running noon-time variety show, Eat Bulaga!, which made it the first Philippine TV variety show to be franchised in another country. Its first incarnation, Eat Bulaga! Indonesia, premiered on July 16, 2012, and ended on April 3, 2014, which aired on its original network SCTV. The show returned on its second network, antv from November 17, 2014, to August 8, 2016, and returned from January 30, 2023, to February 17, 2023, with a mix of original and new hosts.

Series overview

History
The show returned as The New Eat Bulaga! Indonesia on antv, airing its pilot on November 17, 2014. This version is nothing like the previous version. While Uya Kuya, Astrid Kuya, Farid Aja and Reza Bukan retained their roles as main hosts, the show debuted with a complete new set of hosts — many of them being Indian actors with shows aired by ANTV — as well as a new layout. Due to the strong presence of Indians and Indian Indonesians with ANTV, this version of the show adopted much Indian as well as Indo-Islamic influence. The show also became more drastically differentiated from the original Filipino program.

The new version also featured a new opening theme song and performance, though its tune was still based on the original and resembles an older version of the Philippine opening song. Viewers were greeted with "Inilah, The New Eat Bulaga! Indonesia", meaning: "This is The New Eat Bulaga! Indonesia," in English. In February 2016, the theme was once-more given a minor change, a faster and modern dance-like mix.

Many of the game segments also debuted with new names, since many of their original Philippine counterparts were discontinued. The show also debuted new game segments in addition to the many changes, hence the adding of "The New" to the show's name to emphasize the large changes.

Viewers also get to watch replays of entire episodes on ANTV's YouTube channel, which also has replays of its other television shows. A unique twist to this version was its celebration of Islamic holidays and feasts, hosting "Ramadan" editions on the Islamic holy month of the same name.

On November 20, 2015, The New Eat Bulaga! Indonesia celebrated its first anniversary with ANTV. The show featured an Indian-influenced celebration, since it had guest appearances by Indian actresses Paridhi Sharma and Lavina Tandon who have a large fan base in Indonesia.

The show ended on June 30, 2016, with one last encore episode airing on August 8, 2016.

On January 30, 2023, The New Eat Bulaga! Indonesia returned for a second time, with Okky Lukman, Leo Consul (from the 2012 version), Rullyabii Margana, Alifa Lubis, Devina Kirana, Ncess Nabati, Aldi Taher and Jasi Michelle as the new set of hosts. Predating the original version by four weeks, The New Eat Bulaga! Indonesia is the first in the franchise's history to make its 16:9 widescreen debut.

The show concluded again, however, on February 17, 2023, after only 18 days of airtime.

Schedule
The New Eat Bulaga! Indonesia returned to the airwaves in its second incarnation, this time on a new network, antv, airing from 8:00 am (WIB) onwards, Monday to Saturday.

On it's third incarnation, The New Eat Bulaga! Indonesia currently airs from 7:00 am to 9:00 am (WIB) (8:00 to 10:00 am PHT), Monday to Friday.

Hosts

First incarnation
 Uya Kuya (2012–2014)
 Andhika Pratama (2013–2014)
 Farid Aja (2012–2014)
 Reza Bukan (2012–2014)
 Narji (2012–2014)
 Rian Ibram (2012–2014)
 Rio Indrawan (2012–2014)
 Jenny Tan (2012–2014)
 Bianca Liza (2012–2014)
 Christie Julia (2012–2014)
 Christina Colondam (2013–2014)
 Ivan Gunawan (2013–2014)
 Gading Marten (2014)
 Aaron Ashab (2012)
 Selfi Nafillah (2012)
 Selena Alesandra (2012–2013)
 Wijaya (2012)
 Ramzi (2012)
 Ciripa (2012)
 Leo Consul (2012–2013)
 Steven Muliawan (2012–2013)
 Tora Sudiro (2013)
 Astrid Khairunnisha (2012–2014)

Second incarnation
 Uya Kuya (2014–2016)
 Astrid Khairunnisha (2014–2016)
 Shaheer Sheikh (2014–2016)
 Saurav Gurjar (2014–2016)
 Reza Bukan (2014–2016)
 Farid Aja (2014–2016)
 Tengku Dewi Putri (2014–2016)
 Lavanya Bharadwaj (2014–2016)
 Ibnu Jamil (2014–2016)
 Brandon Nicholas (2014–2016)
 Vin Rana (2014–2016)
 Rohit Bharadwaj (2014–2016)
 Fiona Fachru Nisa (2014–2016)
 Nita Sofiani (2014–2016)
 Ana Riana (2014–2016)
 Vicky Prasetyo (2015–2016)

Third incarnation
 Okky Lukman (2023)
 Leo Consul (2023)
 Rullyabii Margana (2023)
 Alifa Lubis (2023)
 Devina Kirana (2023)
 Ncess Nabati (2023)
 Aldi Taher (2023)
 Jasi Michelle (2023)

Segments
These were the segments on the show, as they were on ANTV's The New Eat Bulaga! Indonesia, shown with their original names on SCTV's Eat Bulaga! Indonesia, the show adapted some games and segments from the original program:

Studio Segments
 Tokcer Otak Encer (originally "Tokcer", "Indonesia Pintar", from Pinoy Henyo)
 Cari Tahu Biar Tahu (from Bawal Judgmental)
 Zona Rejeki (from Lucky Juan)
 Cocok Gak Cocok (from Heart to Get)

Remote Segments
 Kampung Superstar (from Barangay Superstar)
 Tanjidor Tantangan Rejeki Outdoor (originally "Berbagi Kejuta", "Satu Untuk Semua, Semua Untuk Satu", from Juan for All, All for Juan: Bayanihan of d' Pipol)
 Olympic Bulaga (similar from "Bulagaan Olympics 2020" and "KaPalaro: Palarong Pang Barangay")
 Tangkap Rejeki (based on "Lucky Truck")
 Zumba Bulaga (based on "Zoombarangay: Zoombabait Ninyo, Thank You!")

Discontinued/seasonal segments
 Idola Kampung (originally "Jagoan Karaoke", from Pambato ng Videoke)
 Jackpot Dadakan (Jedak) (from On the Spot, Jackpot!)
 Little Miss Indonesia (from Little Miss Philippines)
 Little Mister Indonesia (from That's My Boy)
 Maju Terus Pantang Mundur (from Laban o Bawi)
 DanceBulaga
 Ekstrim Karaoke
 Masak Gokil
 Super Grandma Indonesia
 That's My Boy Indonesia (from That's My Boy Philippines)
 Olympiade Bayi (from Babylympics)
 The Tailor
 Pekerja Keras
 Barberman
 Turisnesia (from You're My Foreignoy/You're My Foreignay)
 Merah, Putih (from Kontrapelo: Sa Pula, Sa Puti)
 Kanan Kiri Bumbum Cring! (from Kaliwa o Kanan? Wave, Wave, Wave, Win! Win! Win!)
 Beandaan (from Bulagaan University)
 Bolagaan (from Bolagaan)

References

Indonesian variety television shows
2014 Indonesian television series debuts
2016 Indonesian television series endings
Indonesian-language television shows
Television series revived after cancellation
Eat Bulaga!
ANTV original programming
Television series by TAPE Inc.
Indonesian television series based on Philippine television series